Sredny Baskunchak is a rural locality (a settlement) in "Posyolok Nizhny Baskunchak" of Akhtubinsky District, Astrakhan Oblast, Russia. The population was 365 as of 2010. There are 7 streets.

Geography 
Sredny Baskunchak is located 50 km east of Akhtubinsk (the district's administrative centre) by road. Nizhny Baskunchak is the nearest rural locality.

References 

Rural localities in Akhtubinsky District